Stephanie Storey is an American actress, producer, screenwriter, director, editor, cinematographer, and novelist. She is the author of  Oil and Marble, which was followed by Raphael, Painter in Rome. She is perhaps best known for producing the television series, The Writers' Room.

Early life and background
When she was a child, her parents drove the family from coast to coast in a motorhome. When she was eighteen, she went to Europe with a traveling choir. She has snorkeled the Great Barrier Reef and hiked to a glacier on the south coast of Iceland.

She attended Lakeside High School in Hot Springs, Arkansas and graduated in 1993.

Stephanie Storey achieved cum laude and received a Bachelor of Arts in Fine Arts from Vanderbilt University. While at Vanderbilt, she did a semester abroad at Universita di Pisa, studying art and Italian. Storey then went on to receive a Master of Fine Arts in Creative Writing from Emerson College. She attended a Ph.D. program in Art History at Washington University in St. Louis. She has taken classes in screenwriting, fiction, and literature at UCLA Extension. She has been an acting student at Actors Workout Studio, Actors Creative Workshop, and the Elephant Theater. Storey has also studied improv comedy at the Groundlings and University of California, Berkeley.

She has lived in Arkansas, Nashville, Tennessee, Boston, Massachusetts, and St. Louis, Missouri.

Career
For over 15 years, Stephanie Storey has produced over one thousand episodes of national television for networks such as, CBS, ABC, NBC, FOX, PBS, Comedy Central, Oxygen, Sundance, E!, MSNBC. The shows she has written have won NAACP Awards and she has been nominated for a Primetime Emmy Award. She has produced feature films, award-winning documentaries, and new media projects written by Emmy winners and starring talent from series and networks such as The Daily Show, MTV, and Comedy Central.

She is best known as the producer of the first season of The Writers’ Room, with Jim Rash for Sundance, which was nominated for an Emmy for the Breaking Bad episode.

Storey was also the Senior Producer at The Tavis Smiley Show on PBS for eight years. The show produced interviews with politicians, actors, writers, musicians, athletes, scholars, newsmakers, and other visionaries.

She was the Coordinating Producer for the development and relaunch of The Arsenio Hall Show in 2013 for CBS. The premiere week had the highest ratings for any launch of any syndicated talk show in seven years.

As a consulting producer for the first days of development, Storey was the producer of Will Gray’s award-winning documentary about the music industry, entitled Broke.

In 2014, Storey wrote and produced a PBS documentary for narrator, Nick Clooney, in his journey across five classic Hollywood musicals.

Recently, Storey produced and directed the web series Don't Make Me Sick, written by Emmy and Golden Globe Award-winning writer and also her husband, Mike Gandolfi. Other actors in the series include stars and talent from Gilmore Girls, The Daily Show, and The Office.

For both seasons of the series, Storey was one of the producers on Lewis Black’s Root of All Evil, on Comedy Central, where she worked with comics such as Patton Oswalt, Paul F. Tompkins, Andy Kindler, Andy Daly, and Greg Giraldo.

She was also the producer for the Remaking America and Made Visible symposiums, which were filmed at George Washington University and aired on C-SPAN and PBS. Featured panelists included Secretary of Labor Hilda Solis, documentarian Michael Moore, wealth expert Suze Orman, and the president of AFL-CIO, Randi Weingarten.

She has produced projects on almost every lot in Hollywood including, Warner Brothers, Paramount, Sony, Fox, NBC Burbank, KTLA, Sunset-Bronson, Sunset-Gower, Raleigh, KCET, Tribune, Encompass, CBS Television City, CBS Radford, Hollywood Center, and Nick on Sunset.

Storey has also produced segments at NASA’s Kennedy Space Center, and from the International Space Station, Democratic and Republican national conventions and debates, and from downtown New Orleans just two days after Hurricane Katrina.

As a news producer, she has covered such events as the death of Osama bin Laden, Shock and Awe, the election of President Barack Obama, the Great Recession, Arab Spring, Hurricane Katrina, the earthquake in Haiti, among countless others.

She has produced live events at locations around the country, including LA Live in downtown Los Angeles, Lisner Auditorium at George Washington University in Washington, D.C., and the Ebenezer Baptist Church in Atlanta, Georgia. She has produced interviews with politicians, actors, musicians, athletes, authors, artists, professors, CEOs, and newsmakers. She has developed and produced TV shows hosted by Carrie Fisher, governor Jesse Ventura, Candice Bergen, Meghan McCain, Jim Rash, Kevin Nealon, and Lewis Black among others.

Most recently she has written personal pieces for the online news publication, Huffington Post.

Personal life 
Stephanie Storey is married to Mike Gandolfi, an actor, writer, producer, stand-up comic, and editor. They were married on Leap Day at Disneyland on February 29, 2004. They were engaged at the Dromoland Castle in County Clare, Ireland. They now reside in Hot Springs, Arkansas.

When publishing her first novel, Storey considered using the pen name "S.G. Storey", partly as a nod to her husband's last name and partly as a way to mask that she was a woman.

She has a niece named Hannah, a goddaughter named Summer, and cousins named Annaleigh, Addie, and Katie.

Filmography

Awards and nominations

References

External links 

 
 

American film actresses
American film producers
American television actresses
Television producers from California
American women television producers
Living people
Writers from Los Angeles
21st-century American actresses
Vanderbilt University alumni
Emerson College alumni
Washington University in St. Louis alumni
University of California, Berkeley alumni
University of California, Los Angeles alumni
21st-century American novelists
Actors from Hot Springs, Arkansas
American women film producers
Year of birth missing (living people)